Annobonensis is Latin for "of the island of Annobón", it may refer to several species found on the island and in the surrounding waters:

Alvania annobonensis, a species of minute sea snail
Afroablepharus annobonensis, the Annobón lidless skink, a skink species
Anchicubaris annobonensis, a species of woodlice
Chrysallida annobonensis, a species of pyrams
Congophiloscia annobonensis, a species of land crustacean isopods
Mitrella annobonensis, a species of dove snails
Muricopsis annobonensis a species of murex snails
Sphodromantis annobonensis, a species of praying mantis

It also may refer to a subspecies:
Platybelone argalus annobonensis, a subspecies of the keeltail needlefish (Platybelone argalus)

Synonyms
Ficus annobonensis, subspecies of Ficus thonningii, a figtree species
Peperomia annobonensis, synonym of Peperomia vulcanica, a pepperflower species found in West Africa

See also
Annobonae (disambiguation)